Marinus Antonius Been (born 11 December 1963) is a Dutch football manager and former professional player.

As a footballer, Been played for Feyenoord, Pisa, Roda JC, Heerenveen, FC Tirol Innsbruck and Excelsior. He played in an attacking midfield position and was nicknamed "Mariodona" for his dribbling skills, after Diego Maradona and his first name.

Playing career

Club
Born in Rotterdam, South Holland, Been made his professional career debut for Feyenoord on 5 September 1982, in a 1–0 win over N.E.C. Been spent six years at Feyenoord from 1982 to 1988 before moving to Italian side Pisa Calcio in July 1988. During his time in Italy, the club played in Serie A (first) and Serie B (second). After three years in Italy, Been returned to Netherlands where he joined Roda JC and then Heerenveen. After one season at Heerenveen, Been moved to Austria by joining Tirol Innsbruck in 1992. Following his stint at Tirol Innsbruck he returned to Excelsior where he stayed for three years before announcing his retirement. Been played his last competitive match on 17 September 1995 when HFC Haarlem defeated Excelsior Rotterdam 4–0.

International
Been was a member of the Dutch squad at the 1983 FIFA World Youth Championship and played one official international match for the Netherlands, against Austria on 14 November 1984 as substitute for Ton Lokhoff in the 73rd minute.

Managerial career
Been started his coaching career as assistant manager to Bert van Marwijk at Feyenoord in 2000. He held this position until the summer of 2004 when Bert van Marwijk choose to leave Feyenoord and head to Germany to manage Borussia Dortmund. Been headed across Rotterdam to join Feyenoord's sister club Excelsior in 2005 and in his sole season in-charge of the club got them promoted from the Eerste Divisie to the Eredivisie. Along the way his team played attractive football and eventually finished seven points clear of second placed VVV Venlo.

Trinidad and Tobago
After his successful promotion season with Excelsior Been moved to become the assistant manager to Leo Beenhakker at Trinidad and Tobago for the 2006 FIFA World Cup. After the world cup he left Trinidad and Tobago.

NEC Nijmegen

Mario Been moved to NEC Nijmegen in succession of NEC favorite Ron de Groot. Ron de Groot resumed his original position as an assistant-coach. Mario Been came with the image to return the glory years back to the club. In his first season 2006–07 he led the club to a tenth-place finish in the Eredivisie. With the signing of a few players during the summer of 2007 he molded a competitive and attractive team. However, the first half of the 2007–08 season did not go well for Mario Been as his side were sitting bottom of the league at the start of the new year. However, Been managed to remarkably change the fortunes of his team as they went on a run which saw them eventually end 8th in the league standings. This earned the club a UEFA Cup Play-off berth against three other Dutch teams. Been got his team to play very attractive football which resulted in plenty of goals. In the final play-off round against NAC Breda his side won 6–0 at home, and 1–0 away. For the first time Mario Been had qualified a team for European competition.

The season of 2008–09 would be the finest season to date for Mario Been as professional manager. His side were drawn in a tough group in the UEFA Cup with away games at Spartak Moscow and Dinamo Zagreb, while Tottenham Hotspur and Udinese Calcio would come to Nijmegen. At the start of the European campaign his side were labeled the whipping boys of the group. However, after two losses in the group (3–2 against Dinamo Zagreb and 1–0 against Tottenham Hotspur), NEC managed to beat Spartak Moscow in Russia with a scoreline of 2–1. Lasse Schöne scoring the all important goal in that match. The final and decisive game for Been would against Udinese, on a wonderful night for the club, he managed to get the team to a 2–0 scoreline and secure progression to the next round. They eventually lost 4–0 on aggregate to Hamburger SV in the following round, but Mario Been had already written himself into the club's history.  On 28 January 2009, NEC Nijmegen and Feyenoord had reached an agreement to let Been move to Rotterdam to become the head coach and manager there for the next season. On his final match as manager for NEC Nijmegen, Been was applauded by a full Goffert Stadium, with fans singing his name and the players, board and fans giving him the honour of being one of the best managers the club has ever had. Been's farewell speech was filled with tears, however, his last words to the fans epitomized his legendary status at the club.

Feyenoord Rotterdam

Been joined his boyhood club Feyenoord in the summer of 2009 in the hope of repairing the financially stricken club. He was given a very youthful squad to work with, which did have some experienced heads in the form of Roy Makaay, Denny Landzaat and Giovanni van Bronckhorst. His first signing was from his old club where he signed Dani Fernández for the right-back position. Been's first season for Feyenoord was immediately a success as he led them to a fourth-place finish in the league and thus a place in the Europa League for the 2010–11 season. This was also the club's highest finish for a few years. In a turbulent summer which saw all his experienced heads retire, he signed only a handful of players on free transfers or by loan. Feyenoord started the campaign in mixed form. On the opening day they beat FC Utrecht 3–1 to kick off a good start to the campaign. However the club failed to qualify for the group stages of the Europa League after they lost 2–1 to AA Gent on aggregate.

Up until 2011, Been has a contract until 2012 with the club. On 24 October 2010, he oversaw his team losing 10–0 against PSV Eindhoven at the Philips Stadion the biggest defeat in the history of Feyenoord. Despite that, and a rather disappointing final outcome that saw Feyenoord failing to qualify for European football and even in danger of relegation at some point in the season, he was confirmed at the helm of Feyenoord for the new season.

On 13 July 2011, Been was confirmed to have left his post as head coach of Feyenoord, citing lack of trust and confidence from his players as the main reason for his surprise choice.

Genk
In late August 2011, Been was appointed as a new manager of Genk, signing a two-year deal with them and succeeding Franky Vercauteren, who left the club to join United Arab Emirates side Al-Jazira (who led the club winning the Belgian League and 2011 Belgian Supercup and Vercauteren led his club into play-off for UEFA Champions League.) A day after being named the new Coach for Genk, Been held his first training session with the club on Wednesday 31 August. Been would join-up Thomas Buffel at Genk, who coached Buffel from his time as assistant manager at Feyenoord.

In his first match as a Genk manager was a win with Genk beating their rival Sint-Truidense, 4–3. In the Champions League, Genk was placed fourth place in Group E and got three points with no win, three draws and three losses at the group stage of Champions League. Genk's first Champions League game against Valencia was a 0–0 draw, clinched their first Champions League point. Unlike last season with Genk winning the Belgian League, Genk start to have back to back wins, draws and losses with Anderlecht is intentions of the winning the league.

On 9 May 2013, he won the Belgian Cup with Genk. On 23 February 2014, he was sacked.

APOEL
On 26 May 2017, Been was appointed as the new manager of the reigning Cypriot champions APOEL, signing a one-year contract with the club.

On 28 July 2017, after three competitive games in charge, Been was sacked by APOEL following a 1–0 away European defeat to Viitorul Constanta.

Managerial statistics

Personal life 
His son Gianluca (* 1990) played football too for Feyenoord, SBV Excelsior, Deltasport Vlaardingen, VV Oude Maas & BVV Barendrecht and co-owned today with his son Luca, an Tapasvine bar called La Hermana in Barendrecht.

Honours
Genk
Belgian Cup: 2012–13

Notes

References

External links

 
 Profile Mario Been at rodajcspelers.nl 
 

1963 births
Living people
Footballers from Rotterdam
Association football midfielders
Dutch association football commentators
Dutch footballers
Netherlands youth international footballers
Netherlands international footballers
Feyenoord players
Pisa S.C. players
Roda JC Kerkrade players
SC Heerenveen players
FC Wacker Innsbruck players
Excelsior Rotterdam players
Eredivisie players
Serie A players
Serie B players
Austrian Football Bundesliga players
Eerste Divisie players
Dutch expatriate footballers
Expatriate footballers in Italy
Expatriate footballers in Austria
Dutch football managers
Eredivisie managers
Excelsior Rotterdam managers
NEC Nijmegen managers
Feyenoord managers
K.R.C. Genk managers
APOEL FC managers
Dutch expatriate football managers
Expatriate football managers in Belgium
Expatriate football managers in Cyprus
Dutch expatriate sportspeople in Italy
Dutch expatriate sportspeople in Austria
Dutch expatriate sportspeople in Belgium
Dutch expatriate sportspeople in Turkey
Dutch expatriate sportspeople in Cyprus